Martin Eberhard (born ) is an American inventor, engineer and entrepreneur who co-founded Tesla, Inc. (then Tesla Motors) with Marc Tarpenning in 2003. Eberhard served as Tesla's original chairman, and its CEO until late 2007. In 2015, he was inducted into the University of Illinois Engineering Hall of Fame.

Early life and education
Eberhard grew up in Kensington, California, a community in the Berkeley Hills. He received a B.S. in computer engineering from the University of Illinois Urbana-Champaign in 1982 and an M.S. in electrical engineering from the same school in 1984.

Career

Early career
Eberhard began his career as an electrical engineer at Wyse Technology, where he designed the WY-30 ASCII computer terminal as his first product.  Eberhard co-founded Network Computing Devices in 1987, where he served as chief engineer through its IPO on 1992.

In 1996, Eberhard founded NuvoMedia  with  Marc Tarpenning, where they developed the Rocket eBook, the first e-book  with secure internet delivery of content. Eberhard served as chairman and CEO until NuvoMedia’s acquisition by Gemstar in 2000.

Tesla Motors
Eberhard's interest in sports cars, concern  about the dependence on oil imports, and global warming led him to think about EV cars as part of the solution. He found out about and attempted to purchase a prototype EV sports car called the AC Propulsion tzero. He provided some financial and technical support in the conversion of the tzero to lithium-ion batteries. Eberhard then tried to convince AC Propulsion founder Alan Cocconi to turn the tzero into a production car.  When Cocconi declined, Eberhard co-founded (with Marc Tarpenning), and became the first CEO of, Tesla Motors, an electric car company in Menlo Park, California in 2003. 

Eberhard’s guiding principles were:
1) An electric car should not be a compromise. With the right technology choices, it is possible to build electric cars that are actually better cars than their competition.
2) Battery technology is key to a successful electric car. Lithium ion batteries are not only suitable of automotive use; they are game-changing, making decent driving range a reality.
3) If designed right, electric cars can appeal to even the most serious car enthusiast, as electric drive is capable of seriously outperforming internal combustion engines. 

Eberhard drives the second of Tesla Motors Founder's Series Roadsters cars, which is the first series of the Tesla Roadster (2008).

On November 30, 2007, Tesla released a press release titled "Martin Eberhard, Co-founder of Tesla Motors, to Transition to Advisory Board." Fortune magazine reported in December 2007 that chairman Elon Musk had asked Eberhard to leave. Musk stated in an interview that it was not due to ideological differences, but that he did not see a role for Eberhard. On January 7, 2008, the New York Times reported that Tesla Motors issued a statement explaining that the co-founder and former chief executive, Martin Eberhard, "has transitioned from the board of directors and executive management of the company to the advisory board." 

Eberhard noted that while he had signed a non-disclosure agreement with Tesla, "so I must, by contract, be a bit careful about how I word things", he was not happy with the transition. In his since-deleted Tesla Founders Blog, Eberhard criticized Tesla layoffs, which he labeled a "stealth bloodbath".

In June 2009, Eberhard brought a lawsuit against Elon Musk for libel, slander, and breach of contract, alleging that Musk pushed him out of the company, publicly disparaged him, and compromised Tesla's financial health. In August 2009, Eberhard dropped the lawsuit for undisclosed reasons. A Tesla spokesperson declined to comment on the change, raising the likelihood of a settlement. In September 2009, Tesla confirmed the settlement, but did not provide further details.

Eberhard confirmed in an interview with CNBC in October 2019 that he is still a shareholder of Tesla, and is still rooting for their success.

2010–2015
In 2010, Eberhard confirmed to Autoblog Green that he was doing work with Volkswagen, but no further details were provided.

inEVit / Seres
In September 2016, Eberhard founded stealth-mode startup inEVit in a bid to supply major OEMs with electric drivetrains and power storage solutions.

SF Motors (now Seres) acquired inEVit in October 2017. Eberhard served as chief innovation officer until leaving in July 2018.

Tiveni
In 2019 Eberhard founded Tiveni, which seeks to make "intelligent EV battery systems."

Personal life
He is married to Carolyn Eberhard.

References

External links
 

1960 births
American chief executives in the automobile industry
Living people
Tesla, Inc. people
Grainger College of Engineering alumni
Businesspeople from Berkeley, California
People from Kensington, California
American founders of automobile manufacturers
Automotive businesspeople